Doti Multiple Campus is one of the constituent campuses of Tribhuvan University located in Doti district of western Nepal. The campus was established in 1961(2017 BS). It is recognized by University Grants Commission (Nepal)

Bachelor and Master level courses are offerend in this campus in the field of arts, management and sociology.

Infrastructure
The campus has a library, canteen and a sports ground.

References

Tribhuvan University
1961 establishments in Nepal
Buildings and structures in Doti District